The ribboned rope squirrel (Funisciurus lemniscatus) is a species of rodent in the family Sciuridae. It is found in Cameroon, Republic of the Congo, Democratic Republic of the Congo, and Equatorial Guinea. Its natural habitat is subtropical or tropical moist lowland forests.

References

Funisciurus
Rodents of Africa
Mammals described in 1857
Taxonomy articles created by Polbot